Trinity North was a provincial electoral district for the House of Assembly of Newfoundland and Labrador, Canada. As of 2011, there were 8,278 eligible voters living within the district.

The riding was abolished in 2015 into Terra Nova and Bonavista.

When it was abolished, the riding included many of the communities on the north side of Trinity Bay. Clarenville was the major service centre. While the fishery has been depleted, tourism in the Trinity area has been growing steadily.

Includes the communities of Adeytown, Aspey Brook, Brittania, Burgoynes Cove, Butter Cove, Caplin Cove, Champney's East, Champney's West, Clarenville, Clifton, Deep Bight, Dunfield, Elliott's Cove, English Harbour, George's Brook, Gin Cove, Goose Cove, Gooseberry Cove, Harcourt, Hatchet Cove, Hickman's Harbour, Hillview, Hodge's Cove, Ivany's Cove, Lady Cove, Little Heart's Ease, Lockston, Long Beach, Lower Lance Cove, Monroe, Milton, Old Bonaventure, New Bonaventure, Petley, Queen's Cove, Port Rexton, Random Heights, Robinson's Bight, St. Jones Within, Shoal Harbour, Snook's Harbour, Southport, Thorburn Lake, Trinity, Trinity East, Trouty, Waterville, Weybridge.

Members of the House of Assembly
The district has elected the following Members of the House of Assembly:

Election results

|-

|-
 
|NDP
|Vanessa Wiseman
|align="right"|1,247
|align="right"|25.97
|align="right"|
|-

|}

|-

|-

|-
 
|NDP
|Janet Stringer
|align="right"|247
|align="right"|5.15
|align="right"|
|}

|-

|-

|-
 
|NDP
|Howard W. Duffett
|align="right"|340
|align="right"|5.56
|align="right"|
|}

|-

|-

|-
 
|NDP
|Perry Feltham
|align="right"|398
|align="right"|7.21
|align="right"|
|}

|-

|-

|-
 
|NDP
|Dan Corbett
|align="right"|714
|align="right"|12.1
|align="right"|
|}

References

External links 
Website of the Newfoundland and Labrador House of Assembly

Newfoundland and Labrador provincial electoral districts